Rizqallah is a male Christian  given name and surname, meaning livelihood from God.

Males
 Rizqallâh Cheikhô, original name of Louis Cheikhô (1859–1927), Iraqi orientalist and Christian theologian
 René Rizqallah Khawam, known as René R. Khawam (1917–2004), Syrian Christian Arabic-French translator
 Antoine Rizkallah Kanaan Filho, known as Tony Kanaan (born 1974), Brazilian race car driver of Lebanese heritage

Arabic masculine given names